Deesha Philyaw is an American author, columnist, and public speaker. Her debut short story collection, The Secret Lives of Church Ladies, was a finalist for the 2020 National Book Award in fiction and won The Story Prize. Her personal essay writing topics include race, sex, gender, and pop culture.

Early life and education
Philyaw was raised in Jacksonville, Florida. She received a BA in economics from Yale University and an MA in education from Manhattanville College.

Career

Early career 
Philyaw worked in corporate communications at a Pittsburgh-area bank before quitting to pursue her writing consultancy and freelance writing full-time. She cites among her literary inspirations Toni Morrison, James Baldwin, Nafissa Thompson-Spires, Bassey Ikpi, and Tyrese Coleman.

Books 
Philyaw's first book, Co-Parenting 101: Helping Your Kids Thrive in Two Households After Divorce, was written in collaboration with her ex-husband, Michael D. Thomas, and published in May 2013.

Her debut short story collection, The Secret Lives of Church Ladies (2020), received critical acclaim. Writing in the Minneapolis Star Tribune, Marion Winik said “Juicy goodness bursts from every page of Deesha Philyaw's debut short story collection. . . . This collection marks the emergence of a bona fide literary treasure.” A starred review in Kirkus Reviews said, "A collection of luminous stories populated by deeply moving and multifaceted characters. . . . Tender, fierce, proudly black and beautiful, these stories will sneak inside you and take root." The book won the 2020 Los Angeles Times Book Prize, the 2021 PEN/Faulkner Award for Fiction, the 2020/2021 Story Prize and was a finalist for the National Book Award for Fiction.

Other writing
Philyaw has written a series of columns for The Rumpus, titled Visible: Women Writers of Color and for Literary Mama, The Girl is Mine. Her essays have also appeared in the Harvard Review, The New York Times, and The Washington Post.

Podcasting
In 2021, Philyaw appeared on Storybound (podcast) reading an excerpts from her book, The Secret Lives of Church Ladies, with music sampled from Gil Assayas of GLASYS.

Television 
In 2021, it was announced that The Secret Lives of Church Ladies would be adapted for television by HBO Max with Philyaw and actress Tessa Thompson executive producing through Thompson's production company Viva Maude.

Works

Personal life 
Philyaw currently lives in Pittsburgh with her two daughters.

References

External links
 

Year of birth missing (living people)
Living people
21st-century African-American women writers
21st-century African-American writers
Writers from Jacksonville, Florida
Yale University alumni
Manhattanville College alumni
21st-century American short story writers
21st-century American women writers
American women short story writers